The Mill of Morphie is a historic waterwheel in Aberdeenshire, Scotland. The Mill of Morphie is situated nearby to the Stone of Morphie, an unshaped extant standing stone.

See also
 River North Esk

References
 C. Michael Hogan. 2007. Stone of Morphie, The Megalithic Portal, ed. A. Burnham)
 John R. Hume. 1976. The Industrial Archaeology of Scotland, Published by Macmillan of Canada, v.2

Line notes

Watermills in Scotland